Vahagn Garniki Khachaturyan (born 22 April 1959) is an Armenian politician who is the 5th and current president of Armenia. He served as Mayor of Yerevan from 1992 to 1996 and as the Minister of High-Tech Industry from 2021 to 2022.

He was a member of the Armenian National Congress until his resignation in 2017. He led the ANC list in the 2013 Yerevan City Council election, and is currently an independent.

Personal life
Khachaturyan was born in 1959 in Sisian. He is married and has two children. Besides his native Armenian, he also speaks English and Russian.

Early career
He graduated from the Yerevan Institute of National Economy in 1980, with the qualification of economist. From 1980 to 1982, he served in the Soviet Army. After fufiilling his national service, he carried out for the next decade pedagogical activities at the Yerevan Institute, working for the first eight years at the “HrazdanMash” (Hrazdan Instrumental Production) Enterprise as an economist and then at the “Mars” Factory as the deputy general director until 1992.

Political career
From 1990 to 1996, he was a member of the Yerevan City Council, then from 1992 to 1996 he served as the mayor of Yerevan. He was a deputy in the National Assembly of Armenia from 1995 to 1999. From 1996 to 1998 he was an adviser to President of Armenia Levon Ter-Petrosyan. In 2002-Vice President of the Center for Political Science, Law, and Economic Research. He was appointed Minister of High-Tech Industry in August 2021.

Presidency (2022–present)

Following the resignation of President of Armenia Armen Sarkissian in January 2022, the ruling Civil Contract Party nominated Khachaturyan for the presidency. He was elected president by the Armenian parliament in the second round of voting. He was inaugurated on 13 March 2022.

In June 2022, he visited the St. Petersburg International Economic Forum on its 25th anniversary in St. Petersburg, Russia.

Membership
 2000: Founding member of the ARMAT Center for Democracy and Civil Society Development
 2006: Founding member of the social and political initiatives “Aylyntrank”
 2019–2021: Member of the Board of the Armeconombank

References 

|-

|-

1959 births
21st-century Armenian politicians
Living people
Mayors of Yerevan
People from Sisian
Presidents of Armenia